Hazelton Township may refer to the following places in the United States:

 Hazelton Township, Barber County, Kansas 
 Hazelton Township, Shiawassee County, Michigan
 Hazelton Township, Aitkin County, Minnesota
 Hazelton Township, Kittson County, Minnesota
 Hazelton Township, Emmons County, North Dakota

Township name disambiguation pages